Pathways of Life is a 1916 American silent short drama film directed by  Christy Cabanne and starring Lillian Gish.

Cast
 Spottiswoode Aitken as Daddy Wisdom
 Lillian Gish
 Olga Grey
 W. E. Lawrence
 Alfred Paget

Preservation
Pathways of Life is a surviving film with a print at the UCLA Film and Television Archive.

References

External links

1916 films
1916 drama films
1916 short films
Silent American drama films
American silent short films
American black-and-white films
Films directed by Christy Cabanne
1910s American films
1910s English-language films
American drama short films